Valentine National Wildlife Refuge is located in the U.S. state of Nebraska and includes 19,131 acres (77.42 km2). The refuge protects a portion of the largest remaining area of tall and mid grass prairie in the United States.

Development

Collectively known as the sand hills region of Nebraska, the dunes were the end result of the last ice age known as the Pinedale glaciation. During the Holocene glacial retreat the sand dunes that been deposited in their current location by the vast continental glaciers, were exposed and grasses eventually took over.

Management
The refuge is managed by the U.S. Fish and Wildlife Service and along with Fort Niobrara and John and Louise Seier National Wildlife Refuges, they form the Fort Niobrara National Wildlife Refuge Complex. In 1976, the Valentine National Wildlife Refuge was designated as a National Natural Landmark by the National Park Service.

Natural features
Numerous lakes and ponds are located on the refuge, fed by underground seeps and springs. 260 species of birds have been identified over the years on the refuge, and during migratory periods in the spring and fall, 150,000 birds pass through the protected area. Coyote, blanding's turtle, prairie grouse, white-tailed and Mule deer are commonly found by visitors in this refuge. Muskrat and beaver inhabit the wetlands and streams.

Location
Valentine NWR is located about 20 miles (32 km) south of Valentine, Nebraska off U.S. Highway 83.

References

External links
 
 
 

Protected areas of Cherry County, Nebraska
National Wildlife Refuges in Nebraska
National Natural Landmarks in Nebraska
Wetlands of Nebraska
Landforms of Cherry County, Nebraska
Protected areas established in 1935
1935 establishments in Nebraska